Renzo Rubino (born 17 March 1988) is an Italian pop singer songwriter.

Career
Born in Martina Franca, in the southern region of Apulia, Rubino started his music career performing in nightclubs and pubs, then taking part to several national competitions, including Musicultura 2011 in which he was selected among the eight finalists. After winning the related contest "Area Sanremo", in 2013 Renzo entered the 63rd edition of the televised Italian song contest Sanremo Music Festival with Il Postino (amami uomo), a love song with an openly gay lyric. The song won the "Mia Martini" Critics Award.

Discography

Album
2011 – Farvavole
2013 – Poppins
2014 – Secondo Rubino
2017 – Il Gelato Dopo Il Mare

References

External links
Official site

1988 births
Living people
Italian pop singers
People from Martina Franca
21st-century Italian  male singers
Italian male singer-songwriters